Russula redolens, commonly known as the parsley-scented russula, is a basidiomycete mushroom of the genus Russula native to North America. Its flesh smells of parsley.

See also 
 List of Russula species

References

External links

redolens
Fungi described in 1921
Fungi of North America